Razmejin (also Romanized as Rāzmejīn, Rāzmajīn, Rāzemajīn, and Rāẕmejīn; also known as Azmaḩīn, Mazārtajīn, Rāẕīmejīn, Riamagin, and Rizmagin) is a village in Darsajin Rural District, in the Central District of Abhar County, Zanjan Province, Iran. At the 2006 census, its population was 127, in 29 families.

References 

Populated places in Abhar County